The Somabrachyidae are a family of moths in the order Lepidoptera. Other than Somabrachys aegrota, which also occurs in Spain and on Sicily, the family is Afrotropical.

References

Zygaenoidea
Moth families